Raimund Bumatai (December 20, 1952 – October 6, 2005) was an American actor, musician, singer and recording artist, who worked in comedy and live entertainment in Waikiki and in live-action production and animation in Hollywood.

Early life
Bumatai was born on December 20, 1952. He was the older brother of stand-up comedian Andy Bumatai.

Career
He had been active in motion pictures and television since the late 1980s. A supporting actor in many television series filmed in Hawaii, Bumatai often played a local character. In Sherwood Hu's Hawaiian Ghost thriller Lani Loa (1998) he played the character Hawaiian Kenny. Among his more recent work, Bumatai read the part of Tito Makani Jr. on Klasky Csupo's Rocket Power animated series.

Personal life
Bumatai and his wife Karen "Bree" Bumatai, were married in 1993. Together they have a daughter, Cecilly Ann.

Death
Bumatai died in Honolulu on October 6, 2005 at the age of 52, after having been treated for brain cancer at various times during the last years of his life. His last role was the voice of Little Jim in the Scooby-Doo film Aloha, Scooby-Doo!.

Filmography

Film

Television

Video games

References

External links

 Obituary in The Honolulu Advertiser
 Obituary in the Honolulu Star-Bulletin

1952 births
2005 deaths
Actors from Hesse
American male television actors
American male film actors
American male voice actors
Singers from Hawaii
Male actors from Hawaii
Deaths from brain cancer in the United States
20th-century American male actors
21st-century American male actors
20th-century American male singers
20th-century American singers